Xie Zhen may refer to:

Xie Zhen (poet) (1495–1575), Ming dynasty poet
Xie Zhen (Water Margin), fictional Song dynasty outlaw hero from the novel Water Margin
Xie Zhen (footballer), Chinese footballer